Eric Froehlich (born February 9, 1984 in Philadelphia, Pennsylvania) is an American professional poker player, professional Magic: The Gathering player, and member of the Magic: The Gathering Hall of Fame. He lives in Las Vegas, Nevada, with his wife, Magic: The Gathering streamer Athena Huey. As of 2009, Froehlich's total live poker tournament winnings exceed $1,300,000. His 16 cashes at the WSOP account for $867,783 of those winnings.

Early life
Froehlich attended Thomas Jefferson High School for Science and Technology. Froehlich began playing poker in high school and got involved in online poker at the age of 18. He dropped out of the University of Virginia around April 2005 to become a professional poker player.

World Series of Poker bracelets
In the first year, he was eligible to enter a World Series of Poker (WSOP) tournament (2005); Froehlich won a bracelet in the $1,500 limit Texas hold 'em event, making $303,908. At the time, this made him the youngest player to ever win a bracelet.

Froehlich won a second bracelet at the 2006 WSOP tournament in the $1,500 pot limit Omaha w/rebuys event, making $299,675.

Shortly after Froehlich's status as the youngest bracelet winner of all time, he was overtaken by Jeff Madsen during the 2006 World Series of Poker and Steve Billirakis at the 2007 World Series of Poker. In September 2007 at the inaugural World Series of Poker Europe, Norwegian poker player Annette Obrestad won the £10,000 No-Limit Texas Hold'em Championship at the age of 18 to become the youngest World Series of Poker bracelet winner.

Magic: The Gathering career
In addition to playing poker, Froehlich is also a prominent player of the Magic: The Gathering trading card game. Froehlich was a keen sports player when younger, involved in baseball, basketball and football, but suffered an injury and got involved in Magic: The Gathering, like his later friend David Williams. He has made the Top 8 of four Pro Tours and fourteen Grand Prix events. Several of Froehlich's Grand Prix Top 8s have come in team events, in which he has teamed with such prominent professional players as Kamiel Cornelissen, Jon Finkel, Brian Kibler and Luis Scott-Vargas.

In 2015, Froehlich was voted into the Magic: The Gathering Hall of Fame.

Accomplishments

Other accomplishments

 Magic: The Gathering Hall of Fame class of 2015

References

External links

 PokerSourceOnline article
 PokerListings.com interview
 Hendon Mob tournament results

1984 births
American poker players
World Series of Poker bracelet winners
American Magic: The Gathering players
People from Philadelphia
People from Las Vegas
Thomas Jefferson High School for Science and Technology alumni
Living people